Shehr-e-Ajnabi is a Pakistani drama series aired on A Plus Entertainment in the year 2013-2014 and was also selected by Indian channel Zindagi where it aired from 3 February 2016 to 5 March 2016 every Monday to Saturday night 10:20pm.

Plot 

Shehr-e-Ajnabi is an emotional and encouraging drama revolving around Ufaq. Like any other girl of her age, Ufaq too aspires to live her dreams, to pursue higher studies and become a self reliant woman. However, her dreams are shattered when her orthodox parents force her into marriage. Ufaq sees a ray of hope, as her in-laws agrees to allow her to pursue studies, but once she gets married, her mother-in-law shows her true colour. Things do not remain the same for Ufaq when her husband dumps her and marries her friend. Torn between ideals and reality of life, Ufaq decides to start her life afresh on her own. The story beautifully highlights Ufaq's journey from being under the yoke to taking commanding position in her life.

Cast 

 Kiran Haq as Ufaq
 Uzma Gillani as Mahapara Khala
 Javed Sheikh as Azam
 Saba Faisal as Ufaq's Mother
 Mohsin Gillani
 Ahmed Ali Akbar as Haris 
 Anam Tanveer 
 Nosheen Ibrahim
 Sarah Khan
 Kanwar Arsalan
 Imran Ashraf
 Shaheen Khan as Khalda
 Hashim Butt
 Mansha Pasha
 Tipu Shareef
 Sadia Madrangi
 Mohsin Madrangi

References 

Pakistani drama television series
2014 Pakistani television series debuts
2014 Pakistani television series endings
Urdu-language television shows
A-Plus TV original programming